Events from the year 1930 in China.

Incumbents
Chairman of the Nationalist government: Chiang Kai-shek 
Premier: 
 until 22 September: Tan Yankai 
 25 September – 4 December: Soong Tse-ven
 starting 4 December: Chiang Kai-shek
Vice Premier: Feng Yuxiang until 11 October, Soong Tse-ven

Events
 29 January – 24 March: Encirclement Campaign against Hunan–Jiangxi Soviet
 2 March: The League of the Left-Wing Writers was established in Shanghai, at the instigation of the Chinese Communist Party and the influence of the celebrated author Lu Xun. 
 May – 4 November: Central Plains War
 6 May: China signed tariff treaties with Japan. The Republic of China government obtained itself right of tariff autonomy. Some Japanese goods do not need to pay tariffs.
 27 October – 1 December: Musha Incident in Taiwan.
 December – Futian incident

Births
1 January – Sihung Lung, actor (died 2002)
15 April – Zhu Xu, actor (died 2018)
10 June – Chen Xitong, politician (died 2013)
13 June – Li Zehou, philosopher (died 2021)
3 July – Ku Feng, Hong Kong actor
22 November – Li Yining, economist (died 2023)
30 December – Tu Youyou, pharmaceutical chemist
date unknown
Hua Sanchuan, painter and illustrator (died 2004)
Wu Yen-hsia, t'ai chi ch'uan teacher (died 2001)

Deaths
24 February – Wang Zuo and Yuan Wencai, bandit leaders (assassinated)
14 November – Yang Kaihui, second wife of Mao Zedong (born 1901; executed)

References

See also
 List of Chinese films of the 1930s

 
1930s in China
Years of the 20th century in China